Alexandra's Avenue (Greek: Λεωφόρος Αλεξάνδρας Leoforos Alexandras) is a main east–west thoroughfare running from  Patission Street/28 October Street and Kifissias Avenue in the northern part of the city of Athens, Greece.  It is named after Princess Alexandra of Greece, later Grand Duchess Alexandra Georgievna of Russia (daughter of George I of Greece).  The avenue has two regular traffic lanes plus one dedicated bus lane per direction.  Its total length is approximately 3 km.

Panathinaikos Stadium
The sports center of Panathinaikos Athletic Club, named Apostolos Nikolaidis Stadium, lies to the south side near Panormou Street, opposite the St. Savvas Cancer Hospital. It was opened in 1922.

Intersections and other notable landmarks
Major streets that cross this avenue include Mavrommateon, Spyrou Trikoupi, Valtinon, Vasileiou Voulgaroktonou, Charilaou Trikoupi, Ippokratous, Gkyzi, Koniari, Panormou and D. Soutsou Streets.  The avenue features Egiptos Square and the forested Argentinis Dimokratias Square (meaning Argentine Republic) near the Argentine embassy. The Pedion Areos lies to the north in the west end of the avenue while Strefi Hill is to the south. The Ambelokipi metro line 3 station is near Panormou street on the eastern end of the Avenue.

References

Streets in Athens